Paul Tweed (born 1955) is an international lawyer with offices in Belfast, Dublin and London. He is listed in Chambers Legal Guide as a leading lawyer in the field of Defamation and Reputation Management. He is described by Chambers as "synonymous with this type of work" and as a “real legend in this field and a name that everyone knows”.
 
He has been described as one of the most feared defamation lawyers in the world, having represented the likes of Harrison Ford, Justin Timberlake, Jennifer Lopez, Liam Neeson, Britney Spears, Ashton Kutcher, and Uri Geller as well as many others from the worlds of politics, music, film, entertainment and sport.

Having made his name taking action against traditional media outlets, he has since sought to challenge the largely unfettered power of the social media giants, calling for increased regulation of these corporations, many of which have their European headquarters in Ireland.

Early life and education
Born in Bangor, County Down, Tweed attended Bangor Grammar School and Queen's University Belfast where he read Law. After attaining his LLB, he attended the Institute of Professional Legal Studies where he qualified as a solicitor in 1978. He joined the Belfast firm Johnsons the same year he qualified and was made partner in 1983. In 2017, Tweed set up TWEED, an international boutique law firm with offices in Belfast, Dublin and London. The firm provided a bespoke international approach specialising in media law and commercial litigation matters. In 2020, the firm was acquired by Gateley for £2 million and rebranded as Gateley Tweed.

Notable cases
One of Tweed's earliest libel actions of note was against the Sunday World over the reporting of two local senior barristers fighting over a chocolate eclair in a Holywood cake shop. The case was contested in front of a Belfast jury who awarded both men £50,000 each.

In 1992 he represented the plaintiff in the case of Barney Eastwood v Barry McGuigan which resulted in the highest libel award in Northern Irish history.

He acted for former QC and politician Robert McCartney in a settlement that resulted in McCartney receiving £80,000 in damages on the eve of the 1997 election.
 
Tweed has represented Liam Neeson, Britney Spears, Jennifer Lopez, Justin Timberlake, Kelsey Grammer, Nicolas Cage, Harrison Ford, Chris de Burgh, Neil Jordan, Uri Geller, Patrick Kielty, Colin Farrell, Keith Duffy, The Corrs, Ashton Kutcher, Johnny Depp and Sylvester Stallone.

In 2014 he represented X Factor judge and band manager Louis Walsh in which Walsh was awarded €500,000 in damages from The Sun for a libellous headline.
 
He has also represented newspapers including The Sunday Times, The Irish News and Penguin.

Tweed has also acted for journalists including litigation for Irish Independent reporter Gemma O'Doherty with other reported cases including Liam Clarke and Susanne Breen.

He has also been involved in multiple defamation actions against UK and US-based internet book distributors, requiring the issue of the largest number of Writs in respect of the publication of one book.

Media appearances
Tweed is a regular contributor on media law issues in both printed, online and television journalism. He has made many appearances on UK and International news services such as the BBC, UTV, Ireland AM, Al Jazeera, and Bloomberg News. 
His acting for magician Uri Gellar against CNN and The Sun and Richard O'Donovan and Forbes was the subject of the BBC documentary See You in Court which was broadcast in 2011.

He has also addressed the Oxford Union and Feile an Phobail in Belfast, as well as various International Bar Associations and business groups.

Recognition and memberships
Tweed has been listed as the top tier (Band 1) lawyers in both Defamation/Reputation Management and Media & Entertainment fields of the Chambers and Partners guide."

He has also addressed the Parliamentary Joint Committee on the draft Defamation Bill and the Northern Ireland Assembly Committee on the Defamation Act 2013.

He is listed in Chambers Directory as a media and professional indemnity lawyer, a member of the Ministry of Justice Defamation and other Judicial Committees, Member of the Law Society of England and Wales, 1993, Member the Law Society of Ireland, 1999, Member of the Law Society of Northern Ireland, 1978, is registered as a Foreign Legal Consultant, California State Bar and JAMS (alternative dispute resolution).

Publishing
In 2012 Tweed published Privacy and Libel Law; The Clash With Press Freedom.   He is also a regular contributor to publications such as Huffington Post, The Guardian and The Global Legal Post.

References

External links
Official Website 
TWEED

1955 births
Living people
Solicitors from Northern Ireland
People educated at Bangor Grammar School
Alumni of Queen's University Belfast
People from Bangor, County Down